Down and Out Blues is the first LP record by American blues musician Sonny Boy Williamson. The album was released in 1959 by Checker Records (see 1959 in music).

The album was a compilation of Williamson's first singles for Checker, from "Don't Start Me to Talkin'" b/w "All My Love in Vain" through "Dissatisfied" b/w "Cross My Heart".

The album features many famous blues musicians backing Williamson, including Muddy Waters, Otis Spann, and Willie Dixon.

Recording 
The first session that Williamson recorded for Checker was on August 12, 1955 where he recorded "Don't Start Me to Talkin'" and "All My Love in Vain", which were released as a single a month later in September. On January 7, 1956 he recorded "Let Me Explain". The single "Keep It to Yourself" b/w "The Key (To Your Door)" was recorded on August 7, 1956. "Fattening Frogs for Snakes" b/w "I Don't Know" was recorded on February 6, 1957 and was released either in late May or early June. "99" was recorded on September 1, 1957 and was released as the B-side of "Born Blind" in late January or early February 1958. The single "Cross My Heart" b/w "Dissatisfied" was recorded at the same session. "Wake Up Baby" b/w "Your Funeral and My Trial" was the last song on Down and Out Blues to be recorded on March 27, 1958.

Artwork and packaging 
The album cover features a photograph of a homeless person by Don Bronstein, and the liner notes were written by Studs Terkel, who had written Giants of Jazz.

Accolades 
Down and Out Blues was inducted into the Blues Hall of Fame in 2007. In 1988, the album won a W.C. Handy Award for Vintage/Reissue Album (US).

Track listing 
All songs written by Sonny Boy Williamson.
Side one
"Don't Start Me to Talkin'" – 2:30
"I Don't Know" – 2:20
"All My Love in Vain" – 2:45
"The Key (To Your Door)" – 3:10
"Keep It to Yourself" – 2:45
"Dissatisfied" – 2:40
Side two
"Fattening Frogs for Snakes" – 2:16
"Wake Up Baby" – 2:21
"Your Funeral and My Trial" – 2:26
"99" – 2:35
"Cross My Heart" – 3:18
"Let Me Explain" – 2:50

Personnel 
Per liner notes

Sonny Boy Williamson – vocals, harmonica
Muddy Waters – guitar on "Don't Start Me to Talkin'" and "All My Love in Vain"
Jimmy Rogers – guitar on "Don't Start Me to Talkin'" and "All My Love in Vain"
Otis Spann – piano
Willie Dixon – bass
Fred Below – drums
Robert Lockwood, Jr. – guitar
Luther Tucker – guitar
Lafayette Leake – piano on "Wake Up Baby" and "Your Funeral and My Trial"
Eugene Pierson – guitar on "Wake Up Baby" and "Your Funeral and My Trial"

Charts 
Down and Out Blues peaked at #20 on the UK Albums Chart.

Release history

External links 
Down and Out Blues at Yahoo! Music

References 

Sonny Boy Williamson II albums
Checker Records compilation albums
1959 compilation albums
Albums produced by Leonard Chess
Albums produced by Phil Chess
Albums produced by Willie Dixon